Jan Síla (born March 1, 1950) is a Czech neurosurgeon and politician.

Professional career
Síla is a graduate of the Palacký University Olomouc. From 1993 to 2010 he worked as the head of the neurosurgical department at Ostrava City Hospital. He now runs a private neurosurgical clinic.

Politics
Síla was a member of the ANO 2011 movement and chaired the regional association of the movement in Ostrava. He then joined the smaller Political Change Movement party and founded the Change For Life movement. In 2020, it was announced he would stand as a candidate for the Freedom and Direct Democracy party in the upcoming parliamentary election. In the 2021 Czech legislative election, he ran for the SPD movement in 2nd place as a candidate in the Moravia Region and was elected to parliament.

References 

1950 births
Living people
Czech eurosceptics
Czech surgeons
21st-century Czech politicians
Freedom and Direct Democracy MPs
Members of the Chamber of Deputies of the Czech Republic (2021–2025)
Palacký University Olomouc alumni